Louis Joseph Victor Jullien de Bidon (Lapalud, 12 March 1764 – Lapalud, 19 May 1839) was a French officer and nobleman.

Life
He was the elder brother of Bonaparte's aide de camp in Egypt Thomas Prosper Jullien. He became a supernumerary student of artillery on 16 August 1781, a student on 18 January the following year, and a lieutenant on 1 September 1783. He served in the 1st Artillery Regiment (La Fère). He became a captain and second in command of the 5th Artillery Regiment on 1 April 1791 and then adjutant general on 1 Mary 1792, adjutant general and chef de bataillon on 10 pluviôse year II, and adjudant-général chef de brigade on 25 prairial year III.

Pensions and rents

Coat of arms

References

External links
 Archives nationales (CARAN) – Service Historique de l’Armée de Terre – Fort de Vincennes – Dossier S.H.A.T. Côte : 8 Yd 949 ; Dossier Archives nationales : AN : F1bI 164/8.
 Côte S.H.A.T., état de services, distinctions on web.genealogie.free.fr : Les militaires ;
 Les Conseillers d'État on www.napoleonica.org ;
 Chronologie sur La noblesse d'Empire on http://thierry.pouliquen.free.fr.

Bibliography
 

1764 births
1839 deaths
People from Vaucluse
French Republican military leaders of the French Revolutionary Wars
French commanders of the Napoleonic Wars
Counts of the First French Empire
Commandeurs of the Légion d'honneur
Prefects of Morbihan